William James Mallon (born February 2, 1952) is an American orthopedic surgeon, former professional golfer and a leading authority on the history of the Olympic Games.

Golf career
Born in Paterson, New Jersey, Mallon studied at Duke University and graduated magna cum laude with an A.B. in math and physics. While at Duke he played collegiate golf and was a two-time All-American, twice voted to the Outstanding College Athletes of America and was a two-time participant in the NCAA tournament. He won over 40 amateur tournaments including two victories in both the Massachusetts and New England Amateur Championships and one Mid-Atlantic title.

Mallon turned professional in 1975 and joined the PGA Tour after qualifying at Q-school in the fall of 1975. He played four seasons, 1976–79, posting three top-10 finishes with a best finish of tied for 5th at the 1977 Joe Garagiola-Tucson Open. He played in the 1977 U.S. Open and was twice in the top 100 on the money list.

Medical career
After leaving the PGA Tour he returned to Duke University to study medicine graduating as an M.D. in 1984. He was a resident at Duke University medical center between 1984 and 1990 and is now the Associate Consulting Professor of Orthopaedics as well as having his own practice. He specializes in complex reconstructive shoulder and elbow surgery and is a fellow of the American Academy of Orthopaedic Surgeons, a member of the American Shoulder and Elbow Surgeons, where he served as vice-president in 2012 and will be president in 2014, and a member of the advisory council of the Institute of Preventative Sports Medicine. He has written widely on the subject of sporting injuries and has been the medical editor of Golf Digest since 1987. Previously North American editor of the Journal of Shoulder and Elbow Surgery, he has been editor of that publication in 2009.

Olympics historian
Mallon is also a leading authority on the history of the Olympic Games and has written 24 books on the subject. He was a co-founder and later president of the International Society of Olympic Historians and was historical consultant to the organizing committees of both the Atlanta and Sydney Olympics. Mallon has also been a consultant statistician to the IOC and was awarded the Olympic Order in silver in 2001 for services to the Olympic movement.

Amateur wins

1972 New England Amateur
1973 Massachusetts Amateur
1974 Massachusetts Amateur
1975 Middle Atlantic Amateur, New England Amateur

Professional wins
1976 New England Open
1977 New England Open

Select bibliography
 Quest for Gold. Leisure Press New York City 1984  (with Ian Buchanan)
 The Olympic Record Book. Taylor & Francis 1988 
 Who's Who der Olympischen Spiele 1896–1992. Agon-Sportverlag Kassel 1992  (with Erich Kamper)
 The Golf Doctor : How to Play a Better, Healthier Round of Golf. Macmillan 1996  (with Larry Dennis)
 Historical Dictionary of the Olympic Movement. Scarecrow Press 1996  (with Ian Buchanan)
 The 1896 Olympic Games: Results for All Competitors in All Events. With Commentary. McFarland & Company, Jefferson (North Carolina) 1997. . (with Ture Widlund)
 The 1900 Olympic Games: Results for All Competitors in All Events. With Commentary. McFarland & Company, Jefferson (North Carolina) 1997. .
 The 1904 Olympic Games: Results for All Competitors in All Events. With Commentary. McFarland & Company, Jefferson (North Carolina) 1999. .
 The 1906 Olympic Games: Results for All Competitors in All Events. With Commentary. McFarland & Company, Jefferson (North Carolina) 1999. .
 The 1908 Olympic Games: Results for All Competitors in All Events. With Commentary. McFarland & Company, Jefferson (North Carolina) 2000. . (with Ian Buchanan)
 The 1912 Olympic Games: Results for All Competitors in All Events. With Commentary. McFarland & Company, Jefferson (North Carolina) 2001. . (with Ture Widlund)
 The 1920 Olympic Games: Results for All Competitors in All Events. With Commentary. McFarland & Company, Jefferson (North Carolina) 2003. . (with Anthony Bijkerk)
 Orthopaedics for the House Officer.Williams and Wilkins 2000 (with McNamara and Urbaniuk)
 Ernest Amory Codman: The End Result of a Life in Medicine. WB Saunders 1999

References

External links
Medical practice
Olympic database website
Archived version of previous Olympic database website

American male golfers
Duke Blue Devils men's golfers
PGA Tour golfers
Golf writers and broadcasters
Golfers from New Jersey
American orthopedic surgeons
American male non-fiction writers
20th-century American male writers
21st-century American historians
21st-century American male writers
20th-century American historians
Sports historians
Recipients of the Olympic Order
Sportspeople from Paterson, New Jersey
1952 births
Living people
20th-century surgeons
21st-century surgeons
20th-century American physicians
21st-century American physicians
Historians from New Jersey